Thank You, I'm Sorry is an American emo band from Chicago, Illinois.

History
Thank You, I'm Sorry began in 2019. The band started as the solo project of lead singer Colleen Dow. In early 2020, the group signed to Michigan based record label Count Your Lucky Stars Records. As a solo project, Dow recorded and released an acoustic album in February 2020 titled The Malta House. The album title is a reference to the Malta, Illinois. After the release of The Malta Project, the project expanded to a four-piece, consisting of Dow, bassist Bethunni Schreiner, guitarist Abe Anderson, and drummer Sage Livergood. The group released their first album together in mid 2020 titled I'm Glad We're Friends, through Count Your Lucky Stars. The album received positive reviews. In early 2022, the band released a new song titled "Parliaments".

Discography
The Malta House (2020, Count Your Lucky Stars)
I'm Glad We're Friends (2020, Count Your Lucky Stars)

References

Musical groups established in 2019